Schoomaker is a surname. Notable people with the surname include:

Eric Schoomaker (born 1948), American army officer
Peter Schoomaker (born 1946), American army officer, brother of Eric

Occupational surnames